Sadichha Shrestha (born 23 November 1991) is a Nepalese model and beauty pageant winner, who won the tittle of Miss Nepal 2010. She represented Nepal in Miss World 2010. 

As a participant in the Miss Nepal 2010, she won the titles of Miss Personality, Miss Best Walk, and Miss Photogenic, which is the most subtitles won by the same contestant in a Miss Nepal competition. She was also awarded as the VOW Top 10 College Women Competition.

Personal life 
Shrestha married Raul Moktan on 5 July 2022.

References

External links
 FaceBook Profile

Living people
1991 births
Miss World 2010 delegates
Miss Nepal winners
Nepalese female models